Ramona Theresia Hofmeister (born 28 March 1996) is a German snowboarder who competes internationally.

She competed in the 2018 Winter Olympics, where she won a bronze medal in parallel giant slalom.

References

External links

1996 births
Living people
German female snowboarders
Olympic snowboarders of Germany
Snowboarders at the 2018 Winter Olympics
Snowboarders at the 2022 Winter Olympics
Medalists at the 2018 Winter Olympics
Olympic bronze medalists for Germany
Olympic medalists in snowboarding
21st-century German women